Mauro Boselli (born 22 May 1985) is an Argentine professional footballer who plays as a striker for Estudiantes de La Plata.

Boselli began his career at Argentine First Division clubs Boca Juniors and Estudiantes before moving to England in 2010 to join Wigan Athletic. He has also made four appearances for the Argentina national football team.

His style of play has been described by Roberto Martínez as "a clever player and natural finisher ... who can create havoc in the penalty area."

Boselli is a two-time Copa Libertadores winner, being champion with Boca Juniors in 2007 and with Estudiantes de La Plata in 2009. Boselli was the leading goal scorer of the 2009 Copa Libertadores. Boselli also obtained the Copa Sudamericana with Boca Juniors in 2004. Boselli was runners-up with Boca Juniors in the 2007 FIFA Club World Cup.

Club career

Early career
Boselli began playing small sided football at Sportivo Pereyra de Barracas and then to the youth system of All Boys.

Boca Juniors
At the age of 11, Boselli entered the Boca Juniors youth teams. In 2002, Boselli went to Spain with Boca Juniors for a youth tournament and played the final before a game disputed between Bilbao and Roma, when Roma's coach Fabio Capello asked Boselli if he was Italian and if he held a community passport. At Boca Juniors, Boselli played in 30 reserve games before jumping to the first squad. In 2003, Boselli featured in the Boca Juniors under-20 side with Brazilian midfielder Eduardo Martins Nunes.

Boselli debuted in the first-team's pre-season when he was 16. Boselli made his debut for Boca Juniors in a 7–2 defeat to Rosario Central on 6 July 2003, for the last fixture of the 2003 Clausura. In this task, however, many youth team players made their presentation seeings as the starting squad were celebrating winning the 2003 Copa Libertadores days earlier.

In the club's 2004 under-20 side, Boselli shared the squad with teammates as Fernando Gago, Andrés Franzoia and Eduardo Casais. In 2004, Boselli formed a Boca Juniors winning team with Carlos Tevez, Guillermo Barros Schelotto, Pablo Ledesma, Diego Cagna, Sebastián Battaglia, Jonathan Fabbro, Rolando Schiavi, Roberto Abbondanzieri, youth graduate Neri Cardozo and Colombian Fabián Vargas.

In 2005, Boselli noted 2 goals in 11 appearances for the first-team. He did, though, share the team with Belgian player Mikael Yourassowsky.

Loan to Málaga
He subsequently spent the 2005–06 season on loan at Málaga B in the Spanish Segunda División, scoring 5 goals in 32 games. At Málaga, Boselli was one of three South American players in the team, including Peruvian Juan González-Vigil and Brazilian Tiago Marchiori.

2006–2008
After returning to Boca Juniors, Boselli struggled to become a regular in the first team, being behind Martín Palermo and Argentina 2006 FIFA World Cup player Rodrigo Palacio in the coaches' consideration. On 12 December 2007,  Boselli came on as a substitute in the 90th minute for Rodrigo Palacio in Boca Juniors' 1-0 semi-final victory against Tunisian club Étoile Sportive du Sahel in the 2007 FIFA Club World Cup.

Whilst at Boca, the club rejected many loan offers and permanent signing deals, including from Lazio and Catania, always saying that Boselli was not for sale. Six months before departing Boca Juniors, Boselli signed a 4-year contract with the club.

Boselli's final game for Boca Juniors was a 6–2 victory against Tigre in the 2008 Torneo Clausura.

Boselli departed the club at the middle of 2008, disputing a total of 59 official games and starting in 21 of them.

Estudiantes
In July 2008, Estudiantes de La Plata bought 50% of Boselli's transfer rights from Boca, allowing the forward to move to the La Plata outfit. In his first season at Estudiantes, he reunited with former Boca Juniors colleague Rolando Schiavi, and also formed the team with Juan Sebastián Verón. In Estudiantes, Boselli started strongly with 8 goals in 15 league games during his first tournament, the 2008 Apertura. In 2009, he won the Copa Libertadores with Estudiantes. During the competition, Boselli scored 8 goals, finishing as the overall top scorer of the tournament. He also helped the team by scoring the winning goal in the tournament's final against Cruzeiro, in Belo Horizonte. In total, Mauro Boselli scored 49 goals at Estudiantes de La Plata since June 2008. He hit 32 goals in the Argentine Primera División and a further 17 goals in international cups: 12 in the Copa Libertadores, four in the Copa Sudamericana and one in the FIFA Club World Cup. Boselli revealed that Estudiantes coach Alejandro Sabella prepared the squad for six months before playing against 2008/09 UEFA Champions League winners Barcelona, including 15 to 30 minute training sessions on the Tuesdays and Thursdays focusing on how Estudiantes was going to play against Barcelona.

Wigan Athletic
On 29 June 2010, Boselli signed a four-year deal with Wigan Athletic for an undisclosed fee. He made his debut in the opening game of the Premier League season against Blackpool, and scored his first competitive goal for the club against Swansea City in the League Cup on 26 October 2010.
However, following his first goal for the club, Boselli found settling into the English Premier League difficult. In March 2012, Wigan fans voted Boselli as the club's worst ever foreigner.

Genoa
Having struggled to adapt to English football, Boselli was loaned to Italian Serie A side Genoa on 13 January 2011 for the remainder of the 2010–11 season. At Genoa, he teamed up with former Boca Juniors teammate Rodrigo Palacio. He made seven appearances and scored two goals for Genoa, including a match-winning goal in stoppage time against rival club U.C. Sampdoria.

Estudiantes
Before returning to Wigan from his season-long loan at Genoa, Boselli expressed interest in a permanent move to the Italian side. However, he later stated his main aim was to return to Argentina, and was subsequently loaned out to former club Estudiantes for the 2011–12 season. Boselli finished as the club's top goalscorer in both the Apertura and Clausura tournaments, featuring in 29 games and netting 11 goals.

Wigan
Boselli returned to Wigan after a year and a half on loan at two different clubs. He was issued the squad number 19 as Franco Di Santo had taken his original number 9 shirt. After appearing on the bench for the first two league games, briefly appearing away at Southampton in a 2–0 win as an 89th-minute substitute, Boselli returned to starting action by starting for Wigan in a League Cup tie away at Nottingham Forest. Boselli scored the first goal in a 4–1 victory and impressed during the night. It was his second ever goal for Wigan. On 25 September 2012 Boselli scored twice in a 4–1 win away at West Ham in the third round of the League Cup. On 15 January 2013, Boselli grabbed his 4th goal of the season in a 1–0 FA Cup Third Round Replay win away at Bournemouth.

Palermo
In the post match interview following the FA Cup game against Macclesfield on 26 January 2013, 
Wigan manager Roberto Martínez confirmed that Boselli had agreed to a further loan spell, this time back in Italy at Palermo. The move was finalized and officially confirmed by the Sicilian club two days later, on 28 January.

Club León
In June 2013, he moved to Club León in Mexico.

In his first game for Leon, Boselli scored a double, his first goals, in the Copa MX against Dorados. Three days later, he debuted in the Liga MX, scoring in a 2–1 victory against Atlas.

In December 2013, León became champion of Liga MX Apertura 2013, being a key player for the championship and most games played during the season.

Yet again, in the Clausura 2014, he was a key player the next year, when León became champions for the second year in a row making them the second Mexican team to become "bicampeones" in the 6 months modalilty tournament. (Also León won the first "bicampeón" in the 1950s, one year tournament). He is currently the club's second highest goalscorer in its entire history, with 130 goals scored in all competitions.

In 2018, whilst at Leon, Boselli reached marking 200 career goals. Boselli achieved two Liga MX titles for Leon.

Corinthians
In January 2019, he moved to two-time FIFA Club World Cup winner Corinthians in Brazil.

For 2019, Boselli disputed 26 games, scored 8 goals and gave two assistances for Corinthians between the local tournament and the Copa Sudamericana, he also won the 2019 Paulista Championship.

Cerro Porteño
During the Paraguayan superclasico played in August 2021, Boselli scored for Cerro Porteño in a 3–0 victory against Olimpia Asunción.

In September 2021, Boselli departed to Argentina for family matters with permission from Cerro Porteño and was absent from the team, which resulting in the passing of his mother as communicated by the club. In the same month, Cerro Porteño confirmed Boselli's continuity at the club for 2022. This was automatically assured in Boselli's first contract, in reaching a quantity of games would assure a contract extension. This was automatically assured in Boselli's first contract, in reaching a quantity of games would assure a contract extension.

Estudiantes de LP
Boselli departed Cerro Porteño for Estudiantes de La Plata. The transfer was officially complete on 6 January of Paraguay's 2022 summer transfer window.

International career
In 2005, Boselli was part of the Argentina U-20 national team that finished third in the South American Youth Championship (therefore qualifying for that year's U-20 World Cup). However, Boselli was not part of the final World Cup squad.

On 27 September 2009, Boselli was called for a local league based Argentina national team (replacing injured Esteban Fuertes) to play a friendly match against Ghana. Three days later, on 30 September, Boselli debuted with the national team, being brought in as a substitute in the 57th minute of the match. Boselli scored his first goal for Argentina- from the penalty spot- in a 4–1 defeat to Nigeria on 1 June 2011.

Personal life
When he finished secondary, Boselli studied sports periodism.

Career statistics

Club

International goals

|-
| 1. || 1 June 2011 || Abuja Stadium, Abuja ||  || 1–4 || 1–4 || Friendly
|}

Honours

Club
Boca Juniors
Copa Sudamericana: 2004
Copa Libertadores: 2007

Estudiantes LP
Copa Libertadores: 2009

Wigan Athletic
FA Cup: 2013

León
Liga MX (2): Apertura 2013, Clausura 2014

Corinthians
Campeonato Paulista: 2019

Individual

Copa Libertadores top scorer: 2009 (with Estudiantes)
Argentine Primera División top scorer: 2010 Clausura (with Estudiantes)
Liga MX top scorer (4): Apertura 2013, Apertura 2014, Apertura 2015, Apertura 2017
Liga MX Best XI: Apertura 2015, Apertura 2017

References

External links
 MAURO BOSELLI Sitio Oficial 
 
 Argentine Primera statistics at Fútbol XXI  
 
 
 Statistics at Football-Lineups
 
 
 
 

1985 births
Living people
Footballers from Buenos Aires
Argentine footballers
Argentina international footballers
Argentina under-20 international footballers
Argentine expatriate footballers
Association football forwards
Boca Juniors footballers
Atlético Malagueño players
Estudiantes de La Plata footballers
Copa Libertadores-winning players
Wigan Athletic F.C. players
Genoa C.F.C. players
Palermo F.C. players
Club León footballers
Sport Club Corinthians Paulista players
Cerro Porteño players
Argentine Primera División players
Premier League players
Serie A players
Liga MX players
Campeonato Brasileiro Série A players
Expatriate footballers in Spain
Expatriate footballers in England
Expatriate footballers in Mexico
Expatriate footballers in Brazil
Argentine expatriate sportspeople in Spain
Argentine expatriate sportspeople in England
Argentine expatriate sportspeople in Mexico
Argentine expatriate sportspeople in Brazil